De Aki A Ketama is a fusion flamenco album by Spanish band Ketama. It gave the group mainstream recognition within Spain. The album sold over 600,000 copies.

Track listing 
All tracks by Ketama except where noted.

 "No estamos lokos (kalikeño)" – 4:34
 "Verdadero" – 4:13
 "Se dejaba llevar por ti" (Antonio Vega) – 4:18
 "Loko" – 5:30
 "Flor de lis" (Djavan) – 4:35
 "La cuesta la cava (Ketama)" – 4:34
 "Acaba de nacer" – 3:42
 "Djamana Djana" – 4:17
 "Problema" – 4:21
 "Vengo de Borrachera" – 4:31
 "Vente Pá Madrid" – 4:47
 "Bulería del Olivar" – 6:33

Personnel 
Valentín Álvarez – Saxophone
Pedro Barceló – Bateria
Antonio Carmona – Adaptation, Musician
Jose Miguel Carmona – Musician
Juan Carmona – Musician
Luisi Carmona – Coros
Gonzalo Castro – Assistant
José María Cortina – Arranger, Keyboards
Ricardo Mendoza Davila – Photography
Jesús Díaz – Assistant
Luis Dulzaides – Percussion
Camilo Edwards – Bajo Sexto
Manuel García – Graphic Assistant
Paco Ibáñez – Trumpet
Ketama – Arranger
Ove Larsson – Trombone
Carlos Martos – Editing, Mastering
Bernardo Parrilla – Violin
Mayte Pizarro – Coros
Pedro Sánchez – Adaptation, Coros
Paul Smith – Vestuario
Gabriel Vidal – Production Director

References

Ketama albums
1995 albums